Tourism in Mexico is a very important industry. Since the 1960s, it has been heavily promoted by the Mexican government, as "an industry without smokestacks." Mexico has traditionally been among the most visited countries in the world according to the World Tourism Organization, and it is the second-most visited country in the Americas, after the United States. In 2017, Mexico was ranked as the sixth-most visited country in the world for tourism activities. Mexico has a significant number of UNESCO World Heritage sites, with the list including ancient ruins, colonial cities, and natural reserves, as well as a number of works of modern public and private architecture. Mexico has attracted foreign visitors beginning in the early nineteenth century,  with its cultural festivals, colonial cities, nature reserves and the beach resorts. The nation's temperate climate and unique culture – a fusion of the European and the Mesoamerican – are attractive to tourists. The peak tourism seasons in the country are during December and the mid-Summer, with brief surges during the week before Easter and Spring break, when many of the beach resort sites become popular destinations for college students from the United States.

The majority of tourists come to Mexico from the United States and Canada. Other visitors come from other Latin American countries. A small number of tourists also come from Europe and Asia.

History of tourism

19th century

Tourism in Mexico developed following the establishment of the Mexican republic, with writings by Alexander von Humboldt, Frannie Calderón de la Barca, the wife of the Spanish Ambassador to Mexico; John Lloyd Stephens, and Edward B. Tylor being important for attracting more travelers. Tourists from the United States began arriving in Mexico in numbers starting in the 1880s, following construction of direct railway lines in Mexico to the U.S. border. General Porfirio Díaz became president of Mexico by coup in 1876, the beginning of a long period of peace in Mexico following decades of civil war.  With the inauguration of direct Pullman service from the U.S. to Mexico in 1884, tourists no longer endured difficult and dangerous travel.  The Mexican Central Railway actively promoted tourism in the United States, hiring a professional photographer, William Henry Jackson, to visually record the route and a professional writer, James W. Steel, to write promotional copy. Guides for English-speaking tourists were also published, most notably Terry's Guide to Mexico, which went through several editions at the beginning of the twentieth century. Mexico appealed to American tourists seeking an "exotic" holiday. It was promoted in 1890 as the "Egypt of the New World." With the 1910 centennial of Mexican independence, the government undertook an excavation and reconstruction of the Pyramid of the Sun at the huge archeological site of Teotihuacan, near Mexico City. A railway line was constructed from the capital to the site, bringing scholars from the 1910 meeting of the International Congress of Americanists.  In addition, the National Museum of Anthropology was refurbished in advance of the celebrations, in anticipation of tourists.  Mexico was a beneficiary of the increasing tourism of Europeans and Americans to distant lands.  In Mexico, many tourists brought home real or fake relics, and often left graffiti.

20th and 21st centuries

The Mexican Revolution (1910-1920) interrupted tourism in Mexico, but by the 1930s, the Mexican government began promoting tourism again with posters of light-skinned young women and lush gardens.  In the 1920s and 30s, there was an "enormous vogue of things Mexico" in the United States, resulting in cultural exchanges, temporary and permanent art exhibitions, and patronage of Mexican artists, such as muralists Diego Rivera and José Clemente Orozco. Starting with the administration of Plutarco Elías Calles (1924–28), the Mexican government became involved in promoting tourism in Mexico, eventually becoming a cabinet position, the Ministry of Tourism in 1975.

In 1929, Mexican president Emilio Portes Gil officially announced the country's entry into the tourism industry. Over the next few years, the industry stayed small because of the ongoing Great Depression, so the government focused its attention on research and was ready after World War II to welcome tourists who could no longer visit Europe instead.

During the Jazz Age and the era of Prohibition of alcohol in the U.S., border towns in Mexico, particularly Tijuana became destinations for vice tourism. The song "South of the Border (down Mexico way)" song by Frank Sinatra helped promote the region.  It was known for casino gambling, glitzy floor shows, horse- and dog-racing, and other hedonistic pursuits. Chicago gangster Al Capone frequented the Agua Caliente resort, as did big names from Hollywood. "Mafia chic and Hollywood star power fueled the Tijuana mystique and imbued it with ersatz glamour." When Lázaro Cárdenas became president of Mexico, 1934–40, he cracked down on casino gambling in northern Mexico, since it was a source of money and power for Cárdenas's political rivals, former presidents Plutarco Elías Calles and Abelardo L. Rodríguez.

When Cárdenas was governor of his home state of Michoacan (1928–32) and later, when he was president of Mexico (1934–40) and beyond, he promoted tourism to Michoacan and particularly to the historic town of Pátzcuaro. He commissioned murals to show the importance of the region's history to the history of Mexico, promoted indigenous performance in music and dance, and actively had Michoacan advertised as a tourist destination.

The Mexican government developed beach resorts in the 1940s and 1950s in Acapulco, under president Miguel Alemán, who in his post-presidency became Commissioner of Tourism. Other beach resorts on the Pacific coast were also developed, including Mazatlan, Puerto Vallarta and on the Baja California peninsula at Cabo San Lucas. Later on the Yucatan Peninsular the government promoted the development of Cancún. The importance of tourism in Mexico has seen its head having a cabinet-level position. Attracting tourists from the developed world spurred the construction of upscale hotels, particularly by U.S. hotel chains. San Miguel de Allende, Guanajuato developed as an artists' colony. Unlike beach resorts developed by the Mexican government, San Miguel was promoted to tourists by locals.

Starting in the late twentieth century, Mexico has been alert to international venues to both protect tourist destinations such as archeological sites, colonial cities, and natural wonders listed as UNESCO World Heritage Sites. With the inauguration of the UNESCO Intangible Cultural Heritage program, Mexico has certified the cultural importance of Days of the Dead (2003), Mexican cuisine (2010), mariachi music (2011), and charrería (2016), among others. Private philanthropy has played an important role in the preservation and restoration of a number of Mexican sites, most prominently by entrepreneur Carlos Slim, whose Foundation for the Historic Center of the City of Mexico (Fundación del Centro Histórico de la Ciudad de México) has made a significant difference in the historic core of the capital, including security concerns.

Violence and political turmoil in Mexico has been a problem which affects travel and tourism. The years of the Porfirio Díaz regime (1876-1911) saw a decrease in violence and the rise of tourism. The Mexican Revolution 1910-20 was a major civil war, but following that the Mexican government achieved a level internal security that saw the rise of tourism and cultural exchanges in the 1920s and 1930s.  In recent years, with the drug war in Mexico, U.S. State Department travel advisories have alerted tourists to the dangers of certain areas of the country.

Tourist guides and web-based sources

There are a number of useful print guide books to tourist sites in Mexico, including the Michelin Green Guide, Lonely Planet, Rough Guide, Fodor's, Frommer's, and Baedeker's. The Mexican tourist bureau has a website with many resources. Travel websites vary in quality and usefulness.

Tourism industry competitiveness

In the 2017 Travel and Tourism Competitiveness Index (TTCI) report, which is a measurement of the factors that make it attractive to developing business in the travel and tourism industry of individual countries, Mexico was ranked 22nd place in the world's ranking, with tourist service infrastructure rank 43; price competitiveness 63; health and hygiene, 72; safety and security, 113; environmental sustainability, 116.

Statistics
Most visitors arriving to Mexico by air for tourism come from the following countries:

Local Effects

Economic Effects 
The Mexican government has often had a hand in the development of the country's tourist sector. One reason for this was, and still is, tourism's potential to improve the economy, as tourists spend money on accommodations, recreation, food and souvenirs. In the 1920s, the government organized studies of the economy and tourism competitors, collaborated with private companies, and created a national tourism agency in order to capitalize on the economic potential of tourists, especially those from the United States. The tourism industry in 2018 was about 8.7% of Mexico’s GDP and brought the country 215.5 billion Mexican pesos (or 10.8 billion U.S. dollars) in export earnings. That same year, it also provided jobs for over 2.3 million people, which is 6% of the total employment in the nation.

Social Effects 
In the early 20th century, the development of tourism may have increased a sense of national unity and pride among Mexicans because promoting the industry required them to celebrate the unique environment, history and culture that make the country a desirable place to visit.

Much of the tourist economy is focused on large tourist centers and resort areas, some of which were set up by the government itself, such as Cancún in 1970. People from around Mexico migrate to these centers in search of employment. In many cases, the available jobs have allowed women to gain more economic independence. In other instances, where migrants leave their families to find work outside their towns, the move can disrupt family dynamics and other aspects of life back home, despite an increased income.

In places like Cancún, low-wage workers often live in cities outside of the tourist hotspot, in conditions far from that of the resorts and beaches enjoyed by foreign tourists. These people, who typically work in the service sector or construction, often don't make enough money to be able to access these beaches or participate in any of the recreational activities they make possible through their jobs. Additionally, migrant workers can feel pressure to change their language and their clothing styles to fit in with the more Americanized culture of the areas. However, not everyone working in the tourist industry has these same issues, such as those involved with ownership, investment, and even architecture and engineering.

Environmental Effects 

The large-scale development of large resorts and other tourist attractions can be detrimental to the environment, as it threatens ecosystems and their biodiversity. As ecotourism becomes more popular and more tourists seek out environmentally friendly experiences in nature, the Mexican government has formulated plans to create a more sustainable industry. One common method of protecting ecosystems that is used by some NGOs and other organizations is designating protected areas. However, creating these can come at the cost of native people's wellbeing, as it sometimes pushes them out of land they have lived off of for generations and eliminates resources previously shared by local communities.

Rural Areas 
In less populated rural areas, tourism and its impacts take a different shape than in large resort areas. A 2021 study done in Tlaxcala, Mexico, where religious and archaeological tourism have become popular, showed that locals have mixed opinions. 64.5% of people interviewed said that the impact of tourism was positive, and 31.5% said it was "moderately positive," due to economic growth, better transportation and improved public services. Others, however, voiced concerns about traffic, disruptive street vendors catering to tourists, and an increased cost of living. Many people in this area work in the industry, at hotels, restaurants, shops, and archeological sites.

Central Mexico

Mexico City

Mexico City is the capital of Mexico, and its most important city. The historic center of Mexico City is designated a UNESCO World Heritage Site, with ancient archeological ruins, numerous colonial-era churches, most importantly the Cathedral, and the former palace of the Viceroy of New Spain, now the National Palace. The cathedral and National Palace are both located on the main plaza, known as the Zocalo. The city has museums of many types, housing cultural treasures of Mexico's history since ancient times to the modern era. One guide rates the National Museum of Anthropology as the top place to visit in Mexico City, located in Chapultepec Park, itself a top tourist attraction for foreign visitors and Mexico City residents. Other museums worth a visit are the Museo de Arte Moderno, the Museo Dolores Olmedo, the Franz Mayer Museum, the Frida Kahlo Museum, the Museo Rufino Tamayo, the archeological museum of the Templo Mayor, adjacent to the National Palace and cathedral; and the Museo Nacional de Historia in Chapultepec Castle, the former residence of viceroys of Mexico, Emperor Maximilian I, and presidents of Mexico until the early twentieth century.

Gallery

Morelos

Just south of Mexico City is the state of Morelos. Its capital, Cuernavaca, is nicknamed The City of Eternal Spring; its year-round benign climate attracts both national and international visitors. Top tourist attractions in Cuernavaca include the Palace of Cortés (16th-century home of the Conquistador, now a regional museum), the archeological site of Teopanzolco, and the Cuernavaca Cathedral. This latter is one of eleven Monasteries on the slopes of Popocatépetl in the state that are considered World Heritage Sites (three others are in the State of Puebla.

Just east of Cuernavaca are the Pueblos Magicos (Magic Towns) of Tepoztlan and Tlayacapan, each with its 16th-century monastery and colorful pre-Lenten carnival. Tepoztlan is also known for its Sunday Tianguis and the Sierra de Tepoztlan with its small pyramid and spectacular view.

Further east is the city of Cuautla, where an important battle took place in 1812 during the Mexican War of Independence. General Emiliano Zapata centered many of his revolutionary activities in and around Cuautla during the Mexican Revolution.

Morelos has a large number of water parks, ranging from small, rustic parks to international attractions. There are also several pre-hispanic pyramid sites, notably that of Xochicalco.

Southern Mexico

Southern Mexico is the home of many surviving indigenous cultures and is a destination for many foreign and domestic tourists in Mexico. The dense indigenous populations in the prehispanic era saw the rise of civilizations, with enormous archeological sites indicating their complexity. The rugged terrain of southern Mexico and the lack of mineral wealth drawing large numbers of Spanish settlers in the colonial era and in the post-independence era has meant that southern Mexico remains highly indigenous in character.

Oaxaca
Oaxaca in central southern Mexico has remained highly indigenous into the modern era and the destination for tourists wishing to experience the various indigenous cultures there.  The capital of the state is Oaxaca City, is where most tourists stay, after arrival by plane at the major airport.  Tourists can use the capital as a base for day-trip excursions outside the capital to visit towns specializing in particular crafts, often sold in traditional local markets (tianguis). Craft-making towns include Santa María Atzompa,(pottery); San Bartolo Coyotepec, (black pottery); Ocotlán, Oaxaca (pottery); San Martín Tilcajete, fantastical carvings called (alebrijes); and Teotitlan del Valle, rugs. Oaxacan cuisine is notable, with ingredients, such as salted and dried grasshoppers (chapulines), and flavors that are regional.

Places worth visiting outside of the capital include the major archeological site of Monte Albán, as well as Mitla. There are numerous towns with markets and craft production.

Yucatan Peninsula and Chiapas

The peninsula has a considerable number of major archeological sites, including Chichén Itza, Uxmal, and the La Ruta Puuc, a series of small archeological sites. The state capital of Mérida was founded in the colonial era and experienced a major boom in the nineteenth century with the expansion for the market for its sisal cordage or twine,  so that the city has a number of mansions of the former sisal barons. Campeche is Mexico's only walled city.

The Mexican state of Chiapas has the archeological sites of Palenque, Bonampak, and Yaxchilán.  The capital Tuxtla Gutiérrez is the gateway to the region, with a major airport. San Cristóbal de las Casas, named after the early sixteenth-century defender of indigenous rights,  Fr. Bartolomé de las Casas is a colonial-era provincial city.

Central West Mexico
Tourist destinations include Aguascalientes, Guadalajara, Guanajuato, Manzanillo, Morelia, Pátzcuaro, Querétaro, San Miguel de Allende, and Zacatecas.

Guadalajara

Guadalajara, Jalisco, the second-largest Mexican city by population, is home of some of Mexico's best known traditions, such as tequila, mariachi music and charros, or Mexican cowboys. Its similitude with western European countries mixed with modern architecture and infrastructure makes Guadalajara very attractive to tourists. Along with Mexico City and beach destinations (Cancun, Acapulco, etc.), Guadalajara is one of the most visited cities in Mexico. Cultural tourism is the main attraction, the city being home to a large number of museums, art galleries and theatres.  The city is also the host of several internationally renowned events, such as the Guadalajara International Book Fair which is the most important exposition of its kind in the Spanish-speaking world, and the second largest book fair in the world.  The city is known as a pioneer in the underground arts scene as well as in the electronic music world, another main touristic attraction. Its diversity of European architectural styles is a focus of attraction for tourists, in particular the Metropolitan Cathedral, the Degollado Theatre and the Hospicio Cabañas which is a World Heritage Site and one of the oldest hospital complexes in Spanish America. Other tourism activities include shopping at its world class shopping malls, or plazas, taking a tour to the surrounding areas such as the Huentitan Canyon, Tonalá, Tlaquepaque, Chapala or visiting nearby towns, which are well-connected by modern highways, such as Tequila, Puerto Vallarta or Mazamitla, depending upon whether visitors seek urban, coastal or rural getaways.

Morelia
Morelia, Michoacán is the Capital of the State of Michoacán.  Its Historic Downtown Area (Centro Histórico) encompasses approximately 150 city blocks in the city centre, roughly corresponding to the actual area of the city at the end of the 18th century.  The Centro Historico contains over 1,000 historical sites, including (but not limited to) the cathedral and the aqueduct.

Northeast Mexico

Monterrey
Monterrey, Nuevo Leon, was founded in the late 16th century. The downtown district is the oldest section in the city, surrounded by newer neighbourhoods. The Museo de Historia Mexicana (Museum of Mexican History), MARCO (Monterrey Museum of Contemporary Art), Metropolitan Museum of Monterrey and the Museum of the Palacio de Gobierno, or State House, are some of the better known museums in the city, as well as nationally.  The Santa Lucia Riverwalk is a riverwalk similar to the one in San Antonio, Texas, having a length of 2.5 km (1.6 mi) and connecting the Fundidora Park with the Macroplaza, one of the largest plazas in the world.

Northwest Mexico
Northwest Mexico has a few major tourist destinations, including Chihuahua City and Mazatlan. The Copper Canyon Railway travels through rugged scenery.

Beaches 

Acapulco, Guerrero
Cabo San Lucas, Baja California Sur
Cancún, Quintana Roo
Ensenada, Baja California
Altamira, Tamaulipas
Guaymas, Sonora
Tampico, Tamaulipas
Puerto Peñasco, Sonora
Huatulco, Oaxaca
Ixtapa, Guerrero
Manzanillo, Colima
Mazatlán, Sinaloa
Mazunte, Oaxaca
Playa del Carmen, Quintana Roo
Puerto Escondido, Oaxaca
Puerto Vallarta, Jalisco
San José del Cabo, Baja California Sur
Progreso, Yucatan
Zipolite, Oaxaca

The coastlines of Mexico harbor many stretches of beaches that are frequented by sun bathers and other visitors. On the Yucatán peninsula, one of the most popular beach destinations is the resort town of Cancún, especially among university students during spring break. Just offshore is the beach island of Isla Mujeres, and to the east is the Isla Holbox. To the south of Cancun is the coastal strip called Riviera Maya which includes the beach town of Playa del Carmen and the ecological parks of Xcaret and Xel-Há. A day trip to the south of Cancún is the historic port of Tulum. In addition to its beaches, the town of Tulum is notable for its cliff-side Mayan ruins.

On the Pacific coast is the notable tourist destination of Acapulco.  Once the destination for the rich and famous, the beaches have become crowded and the shores are now home to many multi-story hotels and vendors. Acapulco is home to renowned cliff divers: trained divers who leap from the side of a vertical cliff into the surf below.

Along the coast to the south of Acapulco are the surfing beaches of Puerto Escondido, the snorkeling, harbor beach of Puerto Ángel, and the naturist beaches of Zipolite. To the north of Acapulco is the resort town of Ixtapa and the neighboring fishing town of Zihuatanejo. Further to the north are the wild and rugged surfing beaches of the Michoacán coast.

Along the central and north Pacific coast, the biggest draws are beaches of Mazatlán city and the resort town of Puerto Vallarta. Less frequented is the sheltered cove of Bahía de Navidad, the beach towns of Bahía Kino, and the black sands of Cuyutlán. San Carlos, home of the Playa los Algodones (Cotton Beach), is a winter draw, especially for retirees.

At the southern tip of the Baja California peninsula is the resort town of Cabo San Lucas, a town noted for its beaches and marlin fishing. Further north along the Gulf of California is the Bahía de La Concepción, another beach town known for its sports fishing. Closer to the United States border is the weekend draw of San Felipe, Baja California.

Archeological sites

Teotihuacan
Tula
Monte Albán
Chichen-Itzá
Uxmal
Palenque
Tulum
Calakmul and Edzná
Xochicalco
Malinalco
El Tajín
Cholula
Casas Grandes
Chalcatzingo

The central and southern parts of Mexico was where a number of pre-Hispanic civilizations developed, the most prominent being the Aztec, Mayan, and the Olmec as well as Zapotec and Mixtec. There are numerous tourist destinations where these ruins can be viewed. The Mexican government has taken jurisdiction of many sites, often setting guidelines for excavation, preservation, and limitations on numbers of visitors, but nearby indigenous communities, who see these sites as part of their direct cultural heritage, object to those regulations.

The Yucatán peninsula was home to the Mayan people, and many of the indigenous people still speak the language. The area also contains many sites where ruins of the Maya civilization can be visited. The richest of these are located in the eastern half of the peninsula and are collectively known as La Ruta Puuc (or La Ruta Maya). The largest of the Ruta Puuc sites is Uxmal, which was abandoned in the 12th century.

A one-hour drive to the northeast of Ruta Puuc are the surviving remains of the city of Mayapán. This settlement was controlled by Chichén Itzá to the east, now a large archaeological site with many interesting ruins. Other ruins on the peninsula include the aforementioned Tulum on the east coast, Cobá to the northwest of Tulum, Polé (now Xcaret) just south of Playa del Carmen and Calakmul in the nature reserve along the Guatemala border. However this list by no means exhausts the number of archaeological sites to be found in this area.

To the west, the state of Chiapas includes the temples and ruins of Palenque, the glyphs of the city of Yaxchilán, the painted walls of nearby Bonampak, and the remains of the fortress of Toniná. In the city of Villahermosa to the north is the Parque-Museo La Venta, with a collection of Olmec sculptures.

Along the gulf coast area in the state of Veracruz are more archaeological sites, with the Olmec ceremonial center of Tres Zapotes, the ruins of the large Totonac city of Zempoala, and the ruins of El Tajín with the Pyramid of the Niches. The city of Xalapa contains the Museo de Antropología, a notable museum featuring a collection of massive Olmec head sculptures.

In the state of Oaxaca along the Pacific coast are the ruins of Mitla, known as the "City of Death" and of Monte Albán, the remains of the once extensive Zapotec capital and religious center.

Moving to the north, the central region around Mexico City contains several archaeological sites. To the southwest are the massive ruins of Teotihuacán, including the Pyramid of the Sun and the Temple of Quetzalcoatl. To the southeast near the city of Cholula is the Great Pyramid, visible from the city center. Just to the north of Cholula are the well-preserved ruins of the city of Cacaxtla. Last but not least is the Toltec capital of Tula, to the north of Mexico City. In the capital itself is the largest museum in Mexico, the Museo Nacional de Antropología.

Finally, less visited than the major sites are the mysterious ruins of La Quemada, sometimes referred to as Chicomostoc, located south of Zacatecas, Zacatecas in the northern half of Mexico.

Ethnic cultural tourism

Tourists often also seek destinations with living indigenous cultures, such as in Oaxaca and Yucatan. Traditional markets in many small towns have a mixture of ordinary foodstuffs and supplies for the local populations, as well as market-sellers of craft goods that are locally produced. In the state of Oaxaca, various towns specialize in particular crafts, such as weaving of rugs (Teotitlan del Valle) and black pottery (Coyotepec). Some production of Mexican handcrafts and folk art is traditional, and is particularly practiced in Oaxaca, but some artisans respond to tourist demand crafting products for that market exclusively. The Guelaguetza, an annual festival of music and dance by indigenous communities in Oaxaca gives reinforcement of local traditions and deliberately seeks tourists as attendees, staged now in an amphitheater. Another event that is promoted touristically is Mexico's Days of the Dead at the beginning of November and has been listed as a protected cultural practice, entered on the UNESCO Intangible Cultural Heritage Lists.
Towns with specialized crafts:
 San Pablito, Puebla (amate paper)
 Santa María Atzompa, Oaxaca (pottery)
 San Bartolo Coyotepec Oaxaca (pottery)
 Ocotlán, Oaxaca (pottery, blades)
 San Martín Tilcajete, Oaxaca (alebrijes)
 Santa Clara del Cobre, Michoacan (copper crafts)
 Teotitlán del Valle, Oaxaca (rugs)
 Temoaya, State of Mexico (rugs)
 Tlalpujahua, Michoacan (Christmas ornaments)
 Tlaquepaque, Jalisco (pottery)
 Tonalá, Jalisco (pottery, glass, etc.)
 Tenancingo, State of Mexico (rebozos, basketry, furniture)

Gallery of UNESCO Intangible Cultural Heritage in Mexico

Gallery of Crafts in Mexico

Festivals and Celebrations

Mexico has many religious and civic festivals as well as cultural festivals of various kinds.

Since the colonial era, the Roman Catholic Church established a number of festivals, both general and local, celebrating events on the liturgical calendar. Holy Week in Mexico is observed widely, with many re-enactments of events in the last days of the life of Christ. The Christmas season runs for December 12, the feast day of the Virgin of Guadalupe to January 6, the Feast of the Ephiphany, also known as Three Kings.  There are many local religious celebrations by towns, often on the saint's day for which they were named.

Food and drink festivals include the Alfeñique fair in Toluca; the Feria Nacional de San Marcos in Aguascalientes; the International Pasty Festival in Real del Monte, Hidalgo state; the Night of the Radishes (December 23) Oaxaca, and the Puerto Vallarta Gourmet Festival.

A major gathering of Spanish-language booksellers is the annual Guadalajara International Book Fair. The International Cervantes Festival is held annually in Guanajuato. In Oaxaca, the Oaxaca International Literary Competition and the Oaxaca Independent Film Festival are events.

About 225 cities and towns celebrate carnvales before Lent in late February or early March. The largest are in Mazatlán and the city of Veracruz, but such celebrations can be found all across the country: Morelos, Oaxaca, Tlaxcala, Chiapas, Campeche, and Puebla. The larger city "carnavales" employ costumes, elected queens, and parades with floats, but Carnaval celebrations in smaller and rural areas vary widely depending on the level of European influence during Mexico's colonial period.

Historic colonial cities

Campeche, Campeche. The only walled city in Mexico is a UNESCO World Heritage Site.
Cuautla, Morelos. Site of a major battle during the War of Mexican Independence. 
Cuernavaca, Morelos. Historic architecture, including the Palace of Hernán Cortés. 
Dolores Hidalgo, Guanajuato. The site where the Mexican Independence War from Spain began.
Durango, Durango. The most important northern colonial capital city in Mexico. Dubbed the Pearl of the Guadiana Valley, has many colonial mansions, one of these is the Count of Suchil Palace.
Guanajuato, Guanajuato. A major city of colonial Mexico's silver mining, a UNESCO World Heritage Site.
Mérida, Yucatán. Dubbed the white city, with Mayan tradition has many coloniansions of impressive beauty.
Mexico City. The City of Palaces as Alexander von Humboldt called it. It has been the capital of the country for almost 700 years. Since the foundation of the Aztec Empire to the present. A UNESCO World Heritage Site
Morelia, Michoacán. Excellent colonial architecture; a World Heritage Site
Oaxaca, Oaxaca. Colonial architecture and Indigenous traditions are mixed here; it is a World Heritage Site
Puebla, Puebla. The city of known for talavera tiles; its historic center is a World Heritage Site
Querétaro. The state capital has a beautiful baroque downtown, declared a World Heritage Site. Other popular destinations include the third tallest monolith in the world (Peña de Bernal), a city famous for its thermal springs in the middle of a wine and cheese making area (Tequisquiapan), and astonishing natural and cultural beauties in the biosphere reserve of Sierra Gorda.
San Luis Potosí, San Luis Potosí. Rich in ancient times from its mines, this colonial city was the capital of Mexico twice.
San Miguel de Allende, Guanajuato. One of Mexico's oldest towns. Many historic churches and the open-air Plaza Allende.  An exceptionally beautiful Gothic Cathedral is located here.
Taxco, Guerrero. Silver jewelry. A very famous baroque church is located here, its interior is the most admired since the baroque ornamentations are all covered in gold. 
Tlaxcala, Tlaxcala. The city is the capital of the small state of the same name. It has a noble Arabic "Mudejar" open-air chapel, next to the cathedral.
Veracruz, Veracruz. The first City Hall in the Americas was settled here, as well as the historic fort of San Juan de Ulúa. The city was twice occupied by U.S. invaders (1847 and 1914).
Zacatecas, Zacatecas. The city was built during colonial Mexico's silver mining boom; its historic center is a UNESCO World Heritage Site.

Gallery

Ecotourism 

In Latin America, Costa Rica is considered a model for ecotourism, and Mexico is seeking to develop this sector. Aims for what is considered success in the sector is the proportion of tourist dollars that remain in the locality rather than those outside and prevention of large numbers of ecotourists that could undermine tourists' experience of the natural wonders. Mexico has a significant number of sites designated as UNESCO Biosphere Reserves, some of which are tourist destinations.

El Cielo Biosphere
Barranca del Cobre
Cascada de Texolo
Durango
El Nevado 
El Rosario – in the last two months of the year, a mass migration of monarch butterflies reaches the El Rosario sanctuary near Zitácuaro, Michoacán.
Isla Mujeres
Pinacate Peaks
La Bufadora
Reserva de la Biosfera El Cielo
Sian Ka'an
Gulf of California
Parque Nacional Sierra de Organos (Sombrerete, Zacatecas)
Parque Nacional Sierra San Pedro Mártir
Real de Catorce
Ría Lagartos Biosphere Reserve, Yucatan
Tzararecuita
Monarch Butterfly Biosphere Reserve

Medical Tourism 
According to a 2018 survey by the Medical Tourism Association, Mexico is among the top medical destinations for Americans. The Medical Tourism Index ranks Mexico as the 29th most popular destination for medical travelers.

UNESCO World Heritage Sites

UNESCO has designated a number of World Heritage Sites; Mexico has a significant number.
Numbered sites: 1. Centro Histórico de la Ciudad de México; 2. Ciudad Universitaria; 3. Xochicalco; 4. Monasteries on the slopes of Popocatépetl; 5. Luis Barragan House and Studio; 6. Teotihuacan; 7. Monarch Butterfly Biosphere Reserve; 8. Aqueduct of Padre Tembleque

Legend:  World Cultural Heritage Site;  World Natural Heritage Site;  World Cultural and Natural Heritage Site (Mixed)

General tourism

Monterrey, Nuevo León
Nuevo Laredo, Tamaulipas
León, Guanajuato
Guadalajara, Jalisco – and nearby Lake Chapala 
Papantla, Veracruz – vanilla
Piedras Negras, Coahuila
San Cristóbal de las Casas, Chiapas
San Luis Potosí, San Luis Potosí
Saltillo, Coahuila
Tequila, Jalisco
Tijuana, Baja California
Torreón, Coahuila
Puerto Vallarta festival
San Sebastián del Oeste, Jalisco 
Zipolite, and Mazunte, Oaxaca

See also

 List of World Heritage Sites in Mexico
 Cenote
 Pueblos Mágicos
 Visa policy of Mexico
 Secretariat of Tourism
 Architecture of Mexico

Further reading

 Berger, Dina. The Development of Mexico's Tourism Industry: Pyramids by Day, Martinis by Night (2006)  excerpt and text search
 Berger, Dina,  and Andrew Grant Wood, eds.  Holiday in Mexico: Critical Reflections on Tourism and Tourist Encounters (Duke University Press; 393 pages; 2010) . Essays on the history of tourism and related realms in Mexico; topics include the marketing of carnival in Veracruz.
Castañeda, Quetzil. In the Museum of Maya Culture: Touring Chichen Itza. Minneapolis 1996.
Cole, Garold. American Travelers in Mexico, 1821-1972: A Descriptive Bibliography. Troy NY 1978.
Hellier-Tinoco, Ruth. Embodying Mexico: Tourism, Nationalism, and Performance. New York: Oxford University Press 2011.
Honey, Martha. Ecotourism and Sustainable Development: Who Owns Paradise? Washington, D.C. 1998.
Johnston, Barbara R., ed. "Breaking out of the Tourist Trap," Cultural Survival Quarterly 12(1990), 1-64.
Jolly, Jennifer. Creating Pátzcuaro, Creating Mexico: Art, Tourism, and Nation Building under Lázaro Cárdenas. Austin: University of Texas Press 2018.
Kemper, Robert V. and A. Lynn Bolles, eds. "Circum-Caribbean Tourism" in Urban Anthropology 25 (1996), 221-310.
Nash, Dennison. Anthropology of Tourism. Oxford 1996.
Núñez, Theron. "Tourism, Tradition, and Acculturation: Weekendismo in a Mexican Village," Ethnology 2 (1963), 347-352.
Romero, Héctor. Enciclopedia Mexicana del Tourismo. 7 vols. Mexico City 1986.
Ruiz, Jason, Americans in the Treasure House: Travel to Porfirian Mexico and the Cultural Politics of Empire. Austin: University of Texas Press 2014.
Smith, Valene L., ed. Hosts and Ghosts: The Anthropology of Tourism. 2nd ed. Philadelphia 1989.
van den Berghe, Pierre L. The Quest for the Other: Ethnic Tourism in San Cristóbal, Mexico. Seattle 1994.

References

Sources
 “UNWTO Annual Report.” World Tourism Organization. Accessed November 20, 2013. 
 “Cultura Turistica.” Secretaria de Turismo. Accessed November 20, 2013. 
 “Tourist Destinations in Mexico.” 
 Hernandez, Alejandra. (August 2010) “Mexicana de Aviacion se Clausura.” El Universal. Accessed November 20, 2013.

External links
 
 https://www.visitmexico.com/en/ The official tourism site of the government of Mexico
 https://whc.unesco.org/en/list/410/ UNESCO World Heritage Center page for Sian Ka'an Biosphere Reserve

 
.
Mexico
Economy of Mexico